Pants Off is the third home video release and thirteenth Bravo stand-up comedy special by stand-up comedian Kathy Griffin and her fifteenth overall. It was released simultaneously with Tired Hooker. It was originally titled "Kathy Griffin: Pray The Gay Back".

Track listing

Personnel

Technical and production
Kathy Griffin - executive producer
Paul Miller - executive producer
Kimber Rickabaugh - executive producer

Visuals and imagery
Ashlee Mullen - makeup artist

References

External links
Kathy Griffin's Official Website
 

Kathy Griffin albums
Stand-up comedy albums
2011 live albums